Upper Birchwood is a village in Derbyshire, England. It is in the civil parish of Pinxton.

Upper Birchwood lies east of the town of Alfreton, and the Erewash Valley line.

References

External links

Old maps

Villages in Derbyshire
Geography of Amber Valley